Join with Us is the second full-length studio album from the British rock band the Feeling. It was released on 18 February 2008, preceded by the first single from the album, "I Thought It Was Over".

The album sold 41,676 copies in the UK during its first week, debuting at number 1 on the UK Albums Chart. This was lower than the first-week sales of their debut album Twelve Stops and Home, which sold 43,304 copies despite peaking at number 2.

Cover art
The cover art was designed by Juno, a company who had previously produced artwork for Arctic Monkeys and The Zutons. The Feeling's covers and design is by Liz Harry, one third of the design team from Juno, but used this project to launch a solo design career.

Release
The first 50,000 copies of the album were printed with an error in the booklet. The lyrics for "Don't Make Me Sad" were printed twice, and there are no lyrics printed for "Won't Go Away". Also, on these copies, the word "Connor", written either in the title of the song or in the lyrics itself is spelled with only one "n" as "Conor". However on the back of some copies, it is spelled as "Connor", while as "Conor" on others.

Critical reception

Initial critical response to Join with Us was generally positive. At Metacritic, which assigns a normalised rating out of 100 to reviews from mainstream critics, the album received an average score of 66, based on 8 reviews.

Chart performance
On 24 February 2008 Join with Us entered the UK Albums Chart at number 1, one place higher than the band's debut, Twelve Stops and Home. The following week the album dropped to number 11, then to 18 the week after.

In the UK, the album sold more than 160,000 copies, and was certified Gold.

Track listing

Charts

Weekly charts

Year-end charts

Certifications

References

2008 albums
The Feeling albums
Island Records albums